Moustapha Moctar Belbi (born 11 May 1986) at Douala) is a Cameroon footballer.

References

External links
 
 Moustapha Moctar at thefinalball
 Moustapha Moctar at footballmalaysia

1986 births
Living people
Cameroonian footballers
Cameroonian expatriate footballers
Association football midfielders
Tonnerre Yaoundé players
Canon Yaoundé players
Persikota Tangerang players
Saba players
Al-Ahli Club (Manama) players
Riffa SC players
Dhofar Club players
Hajer FC players
Al-Nahda Club (Oman) players
UiTM FC players
Elite One players
Liga 1 (Indonesia) players
Persian Gulf Pro League players
Bahraini Premier League players
Oman Professional League players
Saudi Professional League players
Malaysia Super League players
Expatriate footballers in Indonesia
Expatriate footballers in Iran
Expatriate footballers in Bahrain
Expatriate footballers in Oman
Expatriate footballers in Saudi Arabia
Expatriate footballers in Malaysia
Cameroonian expatriate sportspeople in Indonesia
Cameroonian expatriate sportspeople in Iran
Cameroonian expatriate sportspeople in Oman
Cameroonian expatriate sportspeople in Saudi Arabia
Cameroonian expatriate sportspeople in Malaysia